Ixorheis is a genus of parasitic alveolates in the phylum Apicomplexa.

Taxonomy

Ixorheis is currently the only genus in the family Ixorheidae which in its turn is the sole member of the order Ixorheorida. There is only one currently recognised species in this genus - Ixorheis psychropotae

History

The species was isolated from the digestive tract of the sea cucumber Psychropotes longicauda.

Description

This species has been reported only once and little is known about it.

Gametogony is absent but both merogony and sporogony occur.

References

Apicomplexa genera